Marsh Island is an island on the Penobscot River in Penobscot County.  The Penobscot River borders the eastern side of the island, while the Stillwater River, a side arm of the Penobscot, borders the western side of the island.

Overview
Portions of Old Town and Orono occupy Marsh Island.  The University of Maine campus occupies the southwestern corner of the island while Old Town Municipal Airport and Seaplane Base are at the island's northern end.  U.S. Route 2 crosses the island and connects Old Town and Orono.

A former Georgia-Pacific paper mill is located on the island in Old Town. In 2011 Marsh Island was opened to bow deer hunting.

Gallery

References

Islands of Penobscot County, Maine
Penobscot River
Old Town, Maine
Orono, Maine
Islands of Maine